Lavine may refer to:

Charles Lavine (born 1947), a member of the New York State Assembly
Eric Lavine (born 1971), a Barbadian football player who played in the League of Ireland
Jacqueline Lavine (born 1929), an American swimmer
John Lavine, an American journalist and dean of Northwestern University's Medill School of Journalism
Mark Lavine (1973–2001), a West Indian cricketer
Michael Lavine (born 1963), a portrait photographer based in New York City
Pamela Lavine (born 1969), a West Indies cricketer
Zach LaVine (born 1995), American basketball player

See also
Levine
Lake Lavine, Michigan, a small lake, 87 acres (350,000 m2), in south central Michigan
Lavigne